Anarsia paraisogona is a moth in the family Gelechiidae. It was described by Kyu-Tek Park and Margarita Gennadievna Ponomarenko in 1996. It is found in Thailand.

The wingspan is 10–11 mm. The forewings are pale grey with dark brown scales beyond the costal mark. This costal mark is large and dark brown. The hindwings are grey.

References

paraisogona
Moths described in 1996
Moths of Asia